is an athletic stadium in Isahaya, Nagasaki, Japan. Also known as Nagasaki Athletic Stadium, it received its current name in August 2016 in a deal for naming rights.

The stadium is primarily used for football, and is the home field of the J. League football club V-Varen Nagasaki.

Access 
 JR Kyushu Nagasaki Main Line: 20 minutes walk from Isahaya Station.

Multi-purpose stadiums in Japan
Athletics (track and field) venues in Japan
Football venues in Japan
Rugby union stadiums in Japan
Sports venues in Nagasaki Prefecture
V-Varen Nagasaki
Sports venues completed in 1969
1969 establishments in Japan